Anna Malin Ulrika Persson Giolito (born 25 September 1969 in Stockholm) is a Swedish author and lawyer. She is the daughter of novelist and criminologist, Leif G. W. Persson. Persson Giolito wrote the award-winning book Störst av allt (Quicksand) which has won the awards for Best Swedish Crime Novel in 2016, Glass Key Award in 2017 and the Prix du Polar Européen in 2018.

Early life
Malin Persson Giolito was born 25 September, 1969 in Stockholm, Sweden to novelist and criminologist, Leif G. W. Persson and Birgitta Liedstrand. She grew up in Djursholm, Sweden.

Career

Persson Giolito graduated from Uppsala University in 1994 and initially worked at the European Court of Justice in Luxembourg. She earned a master's degree in European law from the College of Europe in Bruges, Belgium. She has also studied at Stockholm University in Sweden and at the Université catholique de l'Ouest in France.

From 1997 to 2007, Persson Giolito was employed by the law firm Mannheimer Swartling but left when she was expecting her third child. In 2008, she worked as a lawyer in competition law at the European Commission in Brussels and begin writing novels with her first, Dubbla slag, being published by Piratförlaget.

Since 2015, Persson Giolito is a full-time author and lives in Brussels with her family, she also writes for the magazine, Amelia, where she discusses literature.

On July 5, 2017, Persson Giolito hosted the Sommar program on Sveriges Radio P1.

Writing
Persson Giolito writing debut began in 2008 with the novel Dubbla slag. The debut was followed in 2010 with the thriller novel Bara ett barn and in 2012 with Bortom varje rimligt tvivel. In 2016, the multi-award-winning thriller Störst av allt was published.

In September 2017, it was announced that Netflix had ordered an adaption of Störst av allt (Quicksand) to be developed into an eponymous crime drama series, Quicksand (Störst av allt), and would partner with FLX to produce the series. The series premiered on April 5, 2019.

Her latest book Processen was released in 2018.

Bibliography

Filmography

Adaptations
 Quicksand (Störst av allt) — Netflix Original & FLX (2019)

Awards

References

External links

 Official website
 Ahlander Agency Bio

College of Europe alumni
1969 births
Living people
Writers from Stockholm
Swedish crime fiction writers